66th Street may refer to:

66th Street (Manhattan)
66th Street – Lincoln Center (IRT Broadway – Seventh Avenue Line)
66th Street (IRT Ninth Avenue Line)
66th Street/Richfield (Metro Transit station)